
Albert Cuny (16 May 1869 – 21 March 1947) was a French linguist known for his attempts to establish phonological correspondences between the Indo-European and Semitic languages and for his contributions to the laryngeal theory.

He was a student of the French Indo-Europeanist Antoine Meillet (Faral 1947:277). From 1910 until his formal retirement from teaching in 1937 he was a professor of Latin and comparative grammar at the University of Bordeaux (ib. 278). He continued teaching Sanskrit at the University however for the rest of his life (ib.). He was a correspondent of the Académie des inscriptions et belles-lettres (ib. 277).

Cuny's place in the development of the laryngeal theory is described as follows by Émile Benveniste (1935:148):

See also 

Hermann Möller
Indo-Semitic languages
Laryngeal theory

Bibliography

Selected works by Albert Cuny 
 1914. "Notes de phonétique historique. Indo-européen et sémitique." Revue de phonétique 2:101–132.
 1924. Etudes prégrammaticales sur le domaine des langues indo-européennes et chamito-sémitiques. Paris: Champion.
 1924, co-authored with Michel Féghali. Du genre grammatical en sémitique. Paris: Geuthner.
 1943. Recherches sur le vocalisme, le consonantisme et la formation des racines en « nostratique », ancêtre de l'indo-européen et du chamito-sémitique. Paris: Adrien Maisonneuve.
 1946. Invitation à l'étude comparative des langues indo-européennes et des langues chamito-sémitiques. Bordeaux: Brière.

Other works cited 
 Benveniste, Émile. 1935. Origines de la formations des noms en indo-européen. Paris: Adrien Maisonneuve.
 Faral, Edmond. 1947. "Éloge funèbre de M. Albert Cuny." Comptes-rendus des séances de l'Académie des Inscriptions et Belles-Lettres 91.2, 277-279.

Linguists from France
Paleolinguists
Linguists of Indo-Semitic languages
1947 deaths
1869 births